Sate lilit  is a satay variant in Indonesia, originating from Balinese cuisine. This satay is made from minced pork, fish, chicken, beef, or even turtle meat, which is then mixed with grated coconut, thick coconut milk, lemon juice, shallots, and pepper. The spiced minced meat is wound around bamboo, sugar cane or lemongrass sticks, it is then grilled on charcoal. Unlike skewers of other satay recipes which is made narrow and sharp, the bamboo skewer of sate lilit is flat and wide. This wider surface allowed the minced meat to stick and settle. The term lilit in Balinese and Indonesian means "to wrap around", which corresponds to its making method to wrapping around instead of skewering the meat.

Variants
As a Hindu majority island, the Balinese authentic version prefer pork and fish over other meat, and beef is originally seldom consumed in Bali. However to cater larger consumer that do not consume pork, such as Indonesian Muslim majority, in Balinese restaurant outside of Bali sate lilit often used chicken or beef instead. In Balinese fishing towns, such as the village of Kusamba, which faces the Nusa Penida Strait, sate lilit made from minced fish is favoured.

Two of the favorite satay in Bali are sate lilit, and sate ikan (fish satay). Although there are fish sate lilit made with minced fish, sate ikan is using chunk of fish meat instead. The authentic Balinese sate lilit and sate ikan are rich in bumbu, a mixture of spices and herbs. In Bali, almost every dish is flavored with bumbu megenep — a mix of spices and herbs ranging from lime leaves, to coconut milk, garlic, shallots, blue galangal, coriander, lesser galangal, turmeric and chili pepper.

Gallery

See also

 Satay
 Sate padang
 Sate kambing
 Nasi campur
 Lawar

Notes

External links
 Fish Sate Lilit recipe from Tasty Indonesian Food
 Fish Sate Lilit recipe from New York Times

Lilit
Indonesian cuisine
Balinese cuisine